Vladimir Mikhailovich Arkhipov (Russian: Владимир Миха́йлович Архи́пов; 1 June 1933 – 27 October 2004) was a Soviet army general and politician.

Military service 
In 1972 he graduated from the Military Academy of the General Staff. After graduating from the academy, he commanded the 4th Guards Kantemir Tank Division, which garrisoned Moscow. In April 1974 he became the commander of the 32nd Army Corps. In July 1975, Arkhipov was transferred to commander of the 20th Guards Army, stationed in East Germany as part of the Group of Soviet Forces in Germany.

In 1979 he was appointed chief of staff of the Central Asian Military District. In August 1983 he became the commander of the Transcaucasus Military District. In July 1985, Arkhipov was  transferred to the Moscow Military District. On May 4, 1988 he was appointed Deputy Minister of Defense of the USSR and promoted to the rank of General of the army.

Later life and death 
He lived in Moscow for the rest of his career. From 1999 to 2004, he was chaired the Russian Armed Forces Logistics of the Veterans' Council. Arkhipov died on October 27, 2004. He was buried in Moscow at the Novodevichy Cemetery .

Awards 
 Order of the October Revolution
 Order of Red Banner
 Order of the Red Star
 Order "For Service to the Homeland in the Armed Forces of the USSR"
 Jubilee Medal "In Commemoration of the 100th Anniversary of the Birth of Vladimir Ilyich Lenin"
 Medal "For Distinction in Guarding the State Border of the USSR"
 Medal "For Courage in a Fire"
 Jubilee Medal "Twenty Years of Victory in the Great Patriotic War 1941–1945" 
 Medal "Veteran of the Armed Forces of the USSR"
 Medal "For Strengthening of Brotherhood in Arms"
 Jubilee Medal "40 Years of the Armed Forces of the USSR"
 Jubilee Medal "50 Years of the Armed Forces of the USSR"
 Jubilee Medal "60 Years of the Armed Forces of the USSR"
 Jubilee Medal "70 years of the Armed Forces of the USSR"
 Medal "In commemoration of the 850th anniversary of Moscow" (Russian Federation)
 Order "For Merit" in gold (German Democratic Republic)
 Medal Brotherhood in Arms (German Democratic Republic)

References

1933 births
2004 deaths
Burials at Novodevichy Cemetery
People from Shalkar District
Central Committee of the Communist Party of the Soviet Union members
Eleventh convocation members of the Soviet of Nationalities
Army generals (Soviet Union)
Tashkent Higher Tank Command School alumni
Recipients of the Order of the Red Banner
Military Academy of the General Staff of the Armed Forces of the Soviet Union alumni